Alicia Chong Rodriguez is an engineer and inventor who is founder of Bloomer Tech. She designs wearable technologies that can allow for personalized healthcare, particularly in the treatment of cardiovascular disease in women. She was named a TED fellow in 2021.

Early life and education 
Chong Rodriguez is from San José, Costa Rica. She visited Massachusetts Institute of Technology as a high school student. She filled out an application to attend, but realized that her family could not handle the financial pressure. Chong spent two years at the Costa Rica Institute of Technology, before completing her Bachelor's degree in electronic engineering at the Monterrey Institute of Technology and Higher Education. As an undergraduate student, she founded a group called Mujeres en Tecnología to help woman engineers empower one another. After graduating, Chong Rodriguez returned to Costa Rica, where she worked as an engineer at Teradyne. She spent six years in industry before returning to a three-month summer program at Singularity University, where she started to appreciate the potential social impacts of technology. Chong Rodriguez learned that women were underrepresented in research about heart disease, which impacts around 44 million women in the United States. Chong Rodriguez became concerned that as women were underrepresented in clinical trials and scientific research teams, women's symptoms of heart disease were often missed or overlooked. Whilst a student on Singularity University's Global Solutions program, Chong Rodriguez identified that the electrocardiogram devices used to monitor heart abnormalities in women did not provide reliable data. She returned to the Massachusetts Institute of Technology as a Master's candidate, where she worked toward an integrated design and management program. She partnered with her classmates Monica Abarca and Aceil Halaby to use a bra as a tracking advice.

Career
Chong Rodriguez founded Bloomer Tech after graduating from Massachusetts Institute of Technology. The company is named after Amelia Bloomer, an activist for women's rights who encouraged women to wear loose-fitting pants. The Bloomer bra, which is designed to fit the curvature of a woman's body, went into clinical trials in 2018. The bras embedded washable, stretchable and modular sensors. Chong Rodriguez explained that the biggest challenge was achieving a medical-grade signal in the absence of noise, as well as creating a bra that was aesthetically pleasing and comfortable to wear. She oversaw the creation of a mobile app that could collect data and provide activity reports. As part of her 2021 TED fellowship described her design of the smart bra.

Chong Rodriguez is committed to improving diversity in engineering. Alongside launching Mujeres en Tecnología, Chong Rodriguez launched an engineering programme for at-risk young women.

Awards and honors 
 MIT Legatum Fellowship 
 MIT Graduate Women of Excellence Award
 Medtech Boston 40 under 40 Healthcare Innovator
 Inc. (magazine) Top 100 Female Founders 
 TED fellow

References

External links 
 

Living people
American engineers
American inventors
21st-century American businesswomen
21st-century American businesspeople
Women engineers
Women inventors
Costa Rican women scientists
Year of birth missing (living people)
Monterrey Institute of Technology and Higher Education alumni
People from San José, Costa Rica